Innocent When You Dream is a song by Tom Waits appearing on his ninth studio album Franks Wild Years. The song was used as the soundtrack to the closing sequence, Auggie Wren's Christmas Story, in the 1995 film, Smoke.

Accolades 

(*) designates unordered lists.

Personnel
Adapted from the Franks Wild Years liner notes.
 Tom Waits – vocals
Musicians
Ralph Carney – violin
William Shimmel – piano
Production and additional personnel
 Biff Dawes – recording, mixing
 Danny Leake – recording
 Howie Weinberg – mastering

See also
Tom Waits discography

References 

Songs about dreams
1987 songs
Tom Waits songs
Songs written by Tom Waits